Manuel Esperón González (August 3, 1911 – February 13, 2011) was a Mexican songwriter and composer. Along with the famous Mexican author Ernesto Cortazar, Esperón cowrote many songs for Mexican films, including "¡Ay, Jalisco, no te rajes!" for the 1941 film of the same name, "Cocula" for El Peñón de las Ánimas (The Rock of Souls) (1943), and "Amor con amor se paga" for Hay un niño en su futuro (1952). Other Esperón compositions have become Latin standards such as "Yo soy mexicano", "Noche plateada" and "No volveré", which was used in the first episode of the 2001 soap opera El juego de la vida. Among other performers,  Pedro Infante, Los Panchos, and Jorge Negrete have made his songs well-known. His fame in the USA derives from when his song The Three Caballeros was used in the Disney film The Three Caballeros (1944).

Esperón was born in Mexico City. He retired in 1987, although his songs continued to be used in filmmaking and television productions.

Awards
In 1989, Esperón was awarded the Premier National Prize of Mexico for Art and Traditional Culture (de Artes y Tradiciones Populares). In 2001, he was given a tribute at the Palace of Fine Arts in the historical center of Mexico City. Until his death in 2011, he was the honorary President for life of the Society of Authors and Composers of Mexico.

Selected filmography
 While Mexico Sleeps (1938)
 The Rock of Souls (1942)
 María Eugenia (1943)
 The Escape (1944)
 Ramona (1946)
 Tragic Wedding (1946)
 The Associate (1946)
 The Golden Boat (1947)
 The Private Life of Mark Antony and Cleopatra (1947)
 Flor de caña (1948)
 The Perez Family (1949)
 Angels of the Arrabal (1949)
 Midnight (1949)
 The Woman of the Port (1949)
 If I Were Just Anyone (1950)
 Immaculate (1950)
 The Beautiful Dreamer (1952)
 A Place Near Heaven (1952)
 Now I Am Rich (1952)
 The Vagabond (1953)
 You've Got Me By the Wing (1953)
 Made for Each Other (1953)
 The Unknown Mariachi (1953)
 When I Leave (1954)
 Bluebeard (1955)
 Pablo and Carolina (1957)
 Puss Without Boots (1957)
 A Thousand and One Nights (1958)
 It Happened in Mexico (1958)
The Life of Agustín Lara (1959)
 Love in the Shadows (1960)
 Three Black Angels (1960)
 The Partisan of Villa (1967)

References

External links
 
 Bush, John. [ "Manuel Esperón: Biography"]. Allmusic.com
 "Manuel Esperón: Filmography". fandango.com

1911 births
2011 deaths
Musicians from Mexico City
Mexican composers
Mexican male composers
Golden Ariel Award winners
Latin music composers